Predgrad (or Pölland) is a settlement in the Municipality of Kočevje in southern Slovenia. The area is part of the traditional region of Lower Carniola and is now included in the Southeast Slovenia Statistical Region.

The local church is  dedicated to Saints Fabian and Sebastian and belongs to the Parish of Stari Trg ob Kolpi. It is a mid-18th-century Baroque building that replaced an earlier church on the site.

The settlement contains the scant ruins of a 13th-century castle that was destroyed in 1809 by Napoleon's forces.

References

External links
Predgrad on Geopedia

Populated places in the Municipality of Kočevje